Aaron Brand (born June 14, 1975) is a Canadian retired ice hockey center. He attended Lambton College, 1994-96. He lives in Sarnia, Canada.

Junior career
Brand had a successful junior career culminating in the 1995–96 OHL season.  In that season, he was the league leading scorer, was OHL second team all-star, and was named the league's best overall player.  He recorded 46 goals and 119 points during the 1995-96 season, earning the Eddie Powers Memorial Trophy.

He played for Team Canada in the 1997 Maccabiah Games in Israel.

Professional career
Brand never played in the NHL, but played in over 300 games in the American Hockey League for the St. John's Maple Leafs.  Brand also spent time in the Austrian Hockey League, International Hockey League (1945–2001), United Hockey League, West Coast Hockey League, and East Coast Hockey League.

Awards and honours

Career statistics

References

External links

1975 births
Living people
Arkansas RiverBlades players
Bakersfield Condors (1998–2015) players
Canadian ice hockey centres
Cincinnati Cyclones (IHL) players
Competitors at the 1997 Maccabiah Games
HC TWK Innsbruck players
Jewish Canadian sportspeople
Jewish ice hockey players
Maccabiah Games competitors by sport
Maccabiah Games competitors for Canada
Port Huron Beacons players
Sarnia Sting players
St. John's Maple Leafs players
Place of birth missing (living people)